East of Salinas is a 2015 American television documentary film which follows the life of an 8-year-old boy, Jose Anzaldo, the son of Mexican migrant farmworkers living near Salinas, California and his teacher, Oscar Ramos. It was directed by Jackie Mow and Laura Pacheco. The film premiered in December 2015 as part of the PBS documentary series Independent Lens.

References

External links
 

2015 documentary films
2015 films
2015 television films
American documentary television films
2010s English-language films
2010s American films